General elections were held in Malta on 19 and 20 January 1915. Two of the eight elected seats were uncontested.

Background
The elections were held under the Chamberlain Constitution, with members elected from eight single-member constituencies.

Results
A total of 7,907 people were registered to vote. Cikku Azzopardi was elected in both constituencies I and VIII. He chose to give up the seat for constituency VIII, resulting in a by-election in March 1915. However, the candidate elected in the by-election resigned immediately after the election.

References

1915
1915 elections in Europe
1915 in Malta
January 1915 events
1915 elections in the British Empire